Portland Football Club may refer to:
Portland Football Club (South Australia), an Australian rules football club in South Australia, Australia
Portland Football Netball Cricket Club, an Australian rules football, netball and cricket club in Victoria, Australia